Christmas in July is a 1940 comedy film written and directed by Preston Sturges based on his 1931 play A Cup of Coffee. It was Sturges' second film as writer-director, after The Great McGinty, and stars Dick Powell and Ellen Drew.

Plot
Dr. Maxford is thoroughly exasperated; he is supposed to announce on national radio the winners of a slogan contest for his Maxford House Coffee, where the first prize is $25,000. Maxford's jury is deadlocked by the stubborn Mr. Bildocker. As a result, the program ends without an announcement.

Office worker Jimmy MacDonald dreams of winning, hoping to validate himself, provide some luxuries for his mother, and marry his girlfriend, Betty Casey. Betty does not understand his slogan: "If you can't sleep at night, it's not the coffee, it's the bunk."

As a joke, three of his co-workers place a fake telegram on Jimmy's desk informing him that he has won. Jimmy's boss, J. B. Baxter, is so impressed that he promotes Jimmy on the spot to advertising executive, with his own office, a private secretary, and a raise. Tom Darcy, one of the pranksters, tries to clear things up before they go too far, but loses his nerve.

When Jimmy arrives to collect the check, Dr. Maxford assumes his committee finally reached a decision without informing him and writes a check to Jimmy. Jimmy and Betty go on a shopping spree at Shindel's department store. After telephoning Maxford to confirm the check is good, Mr. Shindel gives Jimmy credit to buy an engagement ring for Betty, a luxury sofa-bed for his mother, and presents for all of their neighbors.

When the truth comes out, Shindel descends on Jimmy's street to try to repossess his merchandise. Maxford follows them and confirms Jimmy did not win. In the commotion, Shindel learns that Maxford's signature is genuine; instead of reclaiming the merchandise, he tries to force Maxford to pay for it. Tom and the other two pranksters admit they are to blame.

That night, Jimmy and Betty confess to Baxter. Betty's heartfelt plea persuades Baxter to let Jimmy try to prove himself and keep his promotion, although on a very short probationary period and with no raise. Meanwhile, Bildocker bursts into Maxford's office to announce that the other jury members have finally given in and accepted his choice for the grand prize winner: Jimmy.

Cast
Dick Powell as Jimmy MacDonald
Ellen Drew as Betty Casey
Raymond Walburn as Dr. Maxford
Alexander Carr as Mr. Shindel
William Demarest as Mr. Bildocker
Ernest Truex as J. B. Baxter
Franklin Pangborn as Don Hartman, the radio announcer
Harry Hayden as E. L. Waterbury, Jimmy's office manager
Rod Cameron as Dick, a co-worker
Adrian Morris as Tom Darcy, a co-worker
Harry Rosenthal as Harry, a co-worker
Georgia Caine as Mrs. Ellen MacDonald
Ferike Boros as Mrs. Schwartz
Torben Meyer as Mr. Schmidt, a Shindel's employee
Julius Tannen as Mr. Zimmerman
Al Bridge as Mr. Hillbeiner, a jewelry salesman at Shindel's
Lucille Ward as Mrs. Casey
Kay Stewart as Maxford's secretary
Victor Potel as Davenola salesman

Cast notes:
Christmas in July was the only time Sturges worked with Dick Powell and Ellen Drew, but the film is populated with many of the character actors he used regularly in his films. Aside from William Demarest, they include George Anderson, Al Bridge, Georgia Caine, Jimmy Conlin, Harry Hayden, Arthur Hoyt, Torben Meyer, Charles R. Moore, Frank Moran, Franklin Pangborn, Victor Potel, Dewey Robinson, Harry Rosenthal, Julius Tannen and Robert Warwick. 
This was the fourth of ten films written by Sturges in which Demarest appeared (see note).
Sturges makes a cameo appearance as a man at a shoeshine stand.

Production
The working titles for Christmas in July were "The New Yorkers", "Something to Shout About" and "A Cup of Coffee", the latter of which was the name of the play Sturges wrote in 1931 on which the film was based. A Cup of Coffee remained unproduced until 1988, when Soho Rep in New York City mounted a production. In 1934, Universal hired Sturges to direct a film based on the play, but that project fell through when the studio found other work to assign him, including doctoring the script of Diamond Jim. Once that task was completed, Sturges' mentor at the studio, producer Henry Henigson, left, leaving nobody at Universal to champion Sturges' project. Once Sturges himself moved to Paramount, he made a deal with the studio to buy the script for $6,000.

William Holden and Betty Fields were to have played the leads, with Arthur Hornblow Jr. as producer.

Production on Christmas in July began on June 1, 1940 and continued through June 29. According to author Donald Spoto in his book Madcap: The Life of Preston Sturges, Sturges directed Christmas in July wearing a straw boater and carrying a bamboo cane.

The film was released on October 18th, 1940 and marketed with the tagline, "If you can't sleep at night, it isn't the coffee - it's the bunk" a line from the movie. The film was released on video in the U.S. on July 12, 1990, and re-released on June 30, 1993.

Reception
In 1998, Jonathan Rosenbaum of the Chicago Reader included the film in his unranked list of the best American films not included on the AFI Top 100.

Adaptations 
Lux Radio Theatre presented a radio adaptation of Christmas in July on June 26, 1944, with Dick Powell and Linda Darnell as leads. On September 9th, 1954, NBC presented a television version on Lux Video Theatre with Nancy Gates, Alex Nicol and Raymond Walburn starring; the director was Earl Eby and the adaptation was by S.H. Barnett.

References

External links

Christmas in July on the radio show Hollywood Star Time: July 13, 1946

1940 films
1940 romantic comedy films
1940s screwball comedy films
American romantic comedy films
American satirical films
American screwball comedy films
American black-and-white films
American films based on plays
Films about food and drink
Films directed by Preston Sturges
Films set in New York City
Paramount Pictures films
Films with screenplays by Preston Sturges
Films about coffee
1940s American films